Maurine may refer to:

Places:
Maurine (stream), Mecklenburg-Vorpommern, Germany
Maurine, Missouri, a community in the United States
Maurine, South Dakota, a community in the United States

People:
Maurine (footballer) (born 1986), a Brazilian footballer
Maurine Karagianis (born 1950), Canadian politician
Maurine Brown Neuberger (1907–2000), US senator from Oregon
Maurine Dallas Watkins (1896–1969), American journalist and playwright
Maurine Whipple (1903–1992), American writer

See also
Maurines, a commune in the Cantal department of France
Maureen

Feminine given names